The Australian Alpine Club  was founded in 1950 and is one of the oldest continually existing Alpine clubs in Australia. it was founded in 1950 by Charles Anton. Huts were constructed in the "backcountry" close to Mount Kosciusko, including Kunama Hut, which opened for the 1953 season. A rope tow was installed on Mount Northcote at the site and opened in 1954. The site proved excellent for speed skiing, but the hut was destroyed in an avalanche, which also killed one person, in 1956.

See also

List of alpine clubs
Winter sport in Australia

References

External links

Alpine clubs
Winter sports in Australia
1950 establishments in Australia
Sports clubs established in 1950
Sporting clubs in New South Wales